Arthur Caíke do Nascimento Cruz (born 15 June 1992), known as Arthur Caíke or simply Arthur,  is a Brazilian professional footballer who plays as a winger or a forward for  club Kashima Antlers.

Career
Born in Barbalha, Ceará, Arthur made his senior debut for Iraty in 2010 – a 2-2 Série D draw with Pelotas. He scored his first professional goal the following season, in a 2-0 Campeonato Paranaense win over J. Malucelli.

Londrina and loan spells
In 2011, he moved to Paraná club Londrina and scored 7 goals in 7 games in the Campeonato Paranaense second division and went on to score a further four goals the following season in the Campeonato Paranaense. 

During the 2012 season, Arthur began the first of a number of loan spells from Londrina, starting with Paraná in Série B, followed by spending the majority of the 2013 season with Coritiba – his first appearances in the top-flight of Brazilian football. He scored his first Série A goal with a 90th minute winner against Atletico Mineiro in a 2-1 victory for Coritiba. He also won his first silverware with the club, making 15 appearances and scoring 3 goals in their victorious 2013 Campeonato Paranaense campaign. 

Following a brief loan spell with Figueirense in Série B for the end of the 2013 season, Arthur returned to his parent club Londrina for the start of the 2014 season. Making 16 appearances and scoring 8 goals, he helped Londrina win their first Campeonato Paranaense since 1992, including scoring a hat-trick in the second leg of the semi-final to knock out Athletico Paranaense 5-4 on aggregate, overturning a 3-1 deficit from the first leg. Despite not scoring in the final against Maringá, he did convert his penalty in the penalty shootout to decide the winner of the competition. His form for Londrina earned him a loan move to Série A club Flamengo for the remainder of the 2014 season, making his debut for the club in May 2014 against Fluminense FC in a 2-0 away defeat.

The following season, Arthur returned again to play for Londrina in the 2015 Campeonato Paranaense, but could only help them to a 3rd place finish after getting knocked out at the semi-final stage by former club Coritiba. This is the last time that Arthur represented Londrina, as he then went out on loan to Atlético Goianiense for the remainder of the 2015 season, followed by spending a full season out on loan to Santa Cruz in Série A, where Arthur made 54 appearances in all competitions. With Santa Cruz, Arthur won the 2016 Copa do Nordeste, where he scored the winning goal in the second leg of the final against Campinense, equalising to make it 1-1 and 3-2 on aggregate. Santa Cruz also won the 2016 Campeonato Pernambucano where Arthur scored twice in their semi-final 5-2 aggregate victory over Náutico. They then went on to beat Sport Recife 1-0 on aggregate in the final.

Chapecoense
In 2017, following the 2016 plane crash in which the majority of the first-team squad of Chapecoense died, Arthur was one of the many players that moved on loan to the club for the 2017 season. He went on to make 63 appearances across all competitions and was a key member of the team that won the 2017 Campeonato Catarinense. He also scored his first goal in a continental competition, with a 90th minute goal against Zulia in the group stages of the Copa Libertadores. Arthur was then signed on a permanent basis and was contracted until 2021, although after only making 23 appearances in 2018 he was sold to Saudi Arabian club Al Shabab for the 2018-19 season.

Al Shabab
Arthur scored his first goal for Al Shabab in September 2018, in a 3-1 league win away at Al-Fayha. He went on to only make 15 appearances for Al Shabab, scoring 6 goals, before moving back to Brazil in 2019 to join Bahia on loan.

Loans to Bahia and Cruzeiro
Arthur had a successful spell at Bahia, appearing 46 times and scoring 9 goals – 6 of those coming in Série A. Bahia also won the 2019 Campeonato Baiano, where Arthur played 5 games, including both of legs of the final against Bahia de Feira.

Arthur started the 2020 season back on loan at Bahia, but eventually ended up on loan with Cruzeiro in Série B. After making 25 appearances and scoring 4 goals, his contract was mutually ended with the club before the end of the season and in January 2021 it was announced he was joining J1 League club Kashima Antlers.

Kashima Antlers
Despite the J1 League season beginning in February, due to the COVID-19 pandemic Arthur was only allowed to enter Japan on April 8th and after training in isolation for a number of weeks it wasn't until May 19th that he made his debut for Kashima in a 0-0 J.League Cup draw with Consadole Sapporo. His home league debut arrived the following week, coming on as a late substitute in a 1-0 win over Cerezo Osaka. Arthur scored his first goal for Kashima in July – a 90th minute goal after coming on as a late substitute in a 3-0 win over Tochigi SC in the third round of the Emperor's Cup. Despite missing a large portion of the season, he ended up scoring 7 goals in 22 appearances across all competitions. 
Arthur played a key part in Kashima's fourth place finish in the 2022 season, with the second most goals and the third most assists in the team across all competitions.

Career statistics
.

Honours 
Coritiba
 Campeonato Paranaense: 2013

Londrina
 Campeonato Paranaense: 2014

Santa Cruz
Copa do Nordeste: 2016
Campeonato Pernambucano: 2016

Chapecoense
 Campeonato Catarinense: 2017

Bahia
 Campeonato Baiano: 2019

References

External links

Living people
1992 births
Sportspeople from Ceará
Brazilian footballers
Brazilian expatriate footballers
Association football forwards
Campeonato Brasileiro Série A players
Campeonato Brasileiro Série B players
Campeonato Brasileiro Série D players
Iraty Sport Club players
Londrina Esporte Clube players
Paraná Clube players
Coritiba Foot Ball Club players
Figueirense FC players
CR Flamengo footballers
Atlético Clube Goianiense players
Santa Cruz Futebol Clube players
Associação Chapecoense de Futebol players
Al-Shabab FC (Riyadh) players
Esporte Clube Bahia players
Cruzeiro Esporte Clube players
Kashima Antlers players
Saudi Professional League players
J1 League players
Brazilian expatriate sportspeople in Egypt
Expatriate footballers in Egypt
Brazilian expatriate sportspeople in Saudi Arabia
Expatriate footballers in Saudi Arabia
Brazilian expatriate sportspeople in Japan
Expatriate footballers in Japan